Schwarzenberger is a German surname. Notable people with the surname include:

Reinhard Schwarzenberger (born 1977), Austrian ski jumper
Rolph Ludwig Edward Schwarzenberger (1936–1992), British mathematician
Xaver Schwarzenberger (born 1946), Austrian cameraman and editor

See also
Charles Maurice Schwartzenberger, founder of the Thalia Theater
Ildikó Schwarczenberger (Tordasi) (1951–2015), was a Hungarian woman-fencer
Schwarzenberg (disambiguation)

German-language surnames